Thrissur-Ponnani Kole Wetlands (Malayalam: തൃശൂർ-പൊന്നാനി കോൾ പാടങ്ങൾ) is a wetland lying in Thrissur and Malappuram districts in Kerala, India. It gives 40 per cent of the Kerala’s rice requirement and acts as a natural drainage system for Ponnani city, Thrissur city, Thrissur District, and Malappuram district. The Kole Wetlands is one of largest, highly productive and threatened wetlands in Kerala and it comes in Central Asian Flyway of migratory birds.

History
From 18th century onwards, rice cultivation in Kole lands is said to have been started. But the Thrissur-Ponnani Kole lands recorded rice cultivation dates back to 1916 only.

Geography
The word Kole is a Malayalam word, and means that a bumper yield. It is a particular cultivation method adopted in wastelands in Malappuram district and Thrissur District from December to May which otherwise is submerged from June to November, half of the year. The Kole wetlands lies between 10° 20' and 10° 40' N latitudes and 75° 58' and between 76° 11' E longitudes. The Kole wetlands are low lying tracts located 0.5m to 1m below Mean Sea Level (MSL) and remain submerged for about six months in a year. Kole lands in Thrissur are spread over eight blocks. The average annual rainfall is 3,200 mm and temperature varies from 28°C to 31°5°C. 

The Kole Wetlands cover an area of about 13,632 hectares spread over Thrissur district and Malappuram district. The area extends from Chalakudy River in South to Bharathappuzha River in the North, and to Ponnani Taluk. The Kole Wetlands acts as natural drainage system for Thrissur city and Thrissur district through a network of canals and ponds which connects different parts of Kole Wastelands to Enamavu river,one of the smallest River in Kerala, Canoli Canal, Chettuva River and then to the Arabian Sea. It is fertile with Alluvium soil which is deposited Kechery and Karuvannoor river in the monsoon.

Fauna

In terms of the number of birds, the Thrissur Kole Wetlands is the third largest in India after Chilika Lake in Orissa and Amipur Tank in Gujarat. It has been recognised as one of India's Important Bird Areas by BirdLife International. According to studies, there are 241 species of birds like spot-billed pelican, darter, Oriental darter, black-headed ibis, painted stork, black-bellied tern, cinereous vulture and greater spotted eagle. Fishes like Caranx, Cyprinidae, mangrove red snapper, Megalops cyprinoides and barramundi are also found in Kole Wetland.

Threat
The main threat to Kole Wetlands is expansion of cities and towns like city of Thrissur. The boom in construction industry, especially the real estate business in Central Kerala, has rung the alarm bell for the Kole wetlands. Coconut cultivation, construction of buildings and houses, conversion of fields for sand and clay mining and brick kilns, hunting of wetland birds are the main threats for the Kole wetlands. Fresh water shortage and quality of water due to water intrusion from the Canoly Canal has been reported from various parts of Kole wetlands in Thrissur district.

Kole Development Agency

The Government of India has approved Rs 425-crore project for the comprehensive development of Thrissur Kole fields. The fund will be used for infrastructure development, construction of bunds, canals, roads, farm mechanisation in Kole fields. At the Rs 15 crore a research centre would be set up to study the Kole land development. The Government of Kerala has formed a Special Purpose Vehicle for the implementation of the Kole development project and the District Collector of Thrissur is designated as special officer to coordinate implementation of the package. For the implementation of the project, Government of Kerala has opened an agency known as Kole Development Agency (KDA) in Thrissur City on 30 June for the development of Kole farming. Thrissur District Collector is the special officer to implement the project.

Gallery

References

External links

Wetlands of India
Geography of Malappuram district
Geography of Thrissur district
Protected areas of Kerala
Tourist attractions in Malappuram district
Tourist attractions in Thrissur district
Landforms of Kerala
2002 establishments in Kerala
Protected areas established in 2002
Bharathappuzha